Vasilios Papadopoulos (born 28 January 1995) is a Greek professional footballer who plays as a striker for Super League 2 club Almopos Aridea.

Career
On 9 February 2013, Papadopoulos made his Super League debut for PAOK against OFI.

External links
Papadopoulos at uefa.com
PAOK FC official website

Living people
1995 births
Greek footballers
Greece youth international footballers
Greek expatriate footballers
Iraklis Thessaloniki F.C. players
PAOK FC players
Enosis Neon Paralimni FC players
Super League Greece players
Cypriot First Division players
Expatriate footballers in Cyprus
Association football forwards
Footballers from Kavala